The title City of Seven Hills usually refers to Rome, which was founded on seven hills. However, there are many other cities that make the same claim.

Africa

 Ceuta, Spain
 Ibadan, Nigeria
 Kampala, Uganda - the hills are Mengo, Lubaga, Namirembe, Old Kampala, Kibuli, Nakasero and Makerere
 Yaoundé, Cameroon

Americas
 Albany, New York
 Athens, Texas
 Asunción, Paraguay
 Chicontepec, Mexico, whose name is Nahuatl for "on seven hills"
 Cincinnati, Ohio (now encompasses more than seven)
 Dubuque, Iowa
 Ellicott City, Maryland
 Guaranda, Ecuador
 Kernersville, North Carolina
 Lynchburg, Virginia, College Hill, Garland Hill, Daniel's Hill, Federal Hill, Diamond Hill, White Rock Hill, and Franklin Hill were the original "Seven Hills" of the City of Lynchburg.
Nevada City, California, built upon Aristocracy Hill, American Hill, Piety Hill, Prospect Hill, Wet Hill, Cement Hill, and Lost Hill. There is also a middle school and business district called Seven Hills.
 Newton, Massachusetts
 Nixa, Missouri
 Port Washington, Wisconsin, whose seven hills comprise two High School Hills, North Bluff Hill, South Hill, St. Mary’s Hill, Billy Goat Hill and Sweet Cake Hill.
 Pottsville, Pennsylvania, built on Lawton's Hill, Greenwood Hill, Bunker Hill (Sharp Mountain), Guinea Hill, Forest Hills, Cottage Hill and Mount Hope.
 Providence, Rhode Island, built on Christian Hill, College Hill, Constitution Hill, Federal Hill, Smith Hill, Tockwotten Hill, and Weybosset Hill.
 Richmond, Virginia, built on numerous hills and escarpments to include Union Hill, Church Hill, Council Chamber Hill, Shockoe Hill, Gambles Hill, Navy Hill and Oregon Hill.
 Rome, Georgia
 Rome, Maryland
 Saint Paul, Minnesota, exact list of seven hills varies, but every list includes Cathedral Hill, Capitol Hill, Dayton's Bluff, Crocus Hill (sometimes also called St. Clair), and Williams Hill—which is no longer a hill.
 Valera, Trujillo, Venezuela
 San Francisco, California (see List of hills in San Francisco)
 Seattle, Washington (see Seven hills of Seattle)
 Seven Hills, Ohio
 Somerville, Massachusetts, built on Clarendon Hill, College Hill, Spring Hill, Winter Hill, Central Hill, Plowed Hill, Cobble Hill.
 Staten Island, New York – Fort Hill, Ward Hill, Fox Hill, Grymes Hill, Emerson Hill, Todt Hill, and Richmond Hill.
 Tallahassee, Florida – Goodwood Plantation, Old Fort Park, Mission San Luis, Old Capitol, The Grove, FAMU (Lee Hall), FSU (Westcott Hall)
 Victoria, Argentina
 Washington, D.C., built on Capitol Hill, Meridian Hill, Floral Hills, Forest Hills, Hillbrook, Hillcrest, and Knox Hill.
 Worcester, Massachusetts, built on Pakachoag (Mount St. James), Sagatabscot (Union Hill), Hancock Hill, Chandler Hill (Belmosy Hill), Green Hill, Bancroft Hill, and Newton Hill
 Yonkers, New York

Eurasia

Asia
 Shimla, India: the seven hills are Jakhu Hill, Summer Hill, Bantony Hill, Inveram Hill, Elisium Hill, Observatory Hill and Prospect Hill.
 Amman, Jordan: the seven hills are Qusur, Jufa, Taj, Nazha, Nasser, Natheef, and al-Akhdar.
 Bhopal, India
 Jerusalem: Jerusalem's seven hills are Mount Scopus, Mount Olivet and the Mount of Corruption (all three are peaks in a mountain ridge that lies east of the Old City), Mount Ophel, the original Mount Zion, the New Mount Zion and the hill on which the Antonia Fortress was built.
 Macau
 Mecca, Saudi Arabia
 Mumbai Saat Dweep Samuh (now joined, into a peninsula)
 Tehran, Iran
 Kottayam, India
 Thiruvananthapuram, India
 Tirumala, India: One of the hill towns of Tirumala is where the Temple of Seven Hills, the Tirumala Venkateswara, is located. This temple is one of the most active places of worship in the world.

Europe
 Aalten, Netherlands
 Abergavenny, South Wales, United Kingdom
 Armagh, in Northern Ireland, United Kingdom
 Athens, Greece. The historical seven hills of Athens are Acropolis, Areopagus, Philopappou, Hill of the Nymphs, Pnyx, Lycabettus, and Tourkovounia.
 Bamberg, Bavaria, Germany, The seven hills of Bamberg are; Cathedral Hill, Michaelsberg, Kaulberg/Obere Pfarre, Stefansberg, Jakobsberg, Altenburger Hill, and Abtsberg.
 Barcelona, Catalonia, Spain, is said to be built on Turó del Carmel, Turó de la Rovira, Turó de la Creueta del Coll, Turó de la Peira, Turó del Putxet, Turó de Monterols and Turó de Modolell. Others exclude the latter and include Montjuïc and Mont Tàber, the 17m hill where the Roman city of Barcino was built.
 Bath, England, United Kingdom
 Besançon, France
 Bergamo, Italy
 Bergen, Norway, built not on but between seven mountains. See Seven Mountains, Bergen.
 Bristol, England, United Kingdom
 Brussels, Belgium, said to be built on St. Michielsberg, Koudenberg, Warmoesberg, Kruidtuin, Kunstberg, Zavel and St. Pietersberg
 Bucharest, Romania
 Cagliari, Sardinia, Italy
 Cáceres, Spain
 Chișinău, Moldova
 Durham, England, United Kingdom
 Edinburgh, Scotland, United Kingdom (see Hills of Edinburgh)
 Gorzów Wielkopolski, Poland
 Iaşi, Romania (see Seven hills of Iaşi)
 Istanbul, Turkey (see Seven hills of Istanbul)
 Kaposvár, Hungary
 Kyiv, Ukraine Borichev, Shchekovitsa, Starokievska and Khorevitsa.
 Lisbon, Portugal, São Jorge, São Vicente, Sant’Ana, Santo André, Chagas, Santa Catarina, São Roque
 Lviv, Ukraine
 Liverpool, UK
 Madrid, Spain
 Maribor, Slovenia, seven hills are Pohorje, Kozjak, Kalvarija, Mestni vrh, Piramida, Meljski hrib and Pekrska gorca.
 Moscow, Russia (See Seven hills of Moscow)
 Nijmegen, Netherlands, seven hills within the 16c-19c city wall: Geertruidsberg, Hofberg (Valkhof), Lindenberg, Jansberg, Hundisberg, Hessenberg and Hoofdberg.
 Plovdiv, Bulgaria, originally built on seven hills but now only has six due to one being destroyed in the early 20th century (Markovo tepe)
 Plymouth, England, United Kingdom
 Prague, Czech Republic, said to be built on seven or nine hills: Hradčany, Vítkov, (Opyš), Větrov, Skalka, (Emauzy), Vyšehrad, Karlov and Petřín
 Pula, Croatia
 Rome, Italy (see Seven hills of Rome)
 Saint-Étienne, France
 Sandomierz, Poland
 Sheffield, England, United Kingdom
 Siegen, Germany
 Smolensk, Russia
 Telšiai, Lithuania
 Toulon, France
 Tulle, France
 Turku, Finland
 Veszprém, Hungary
 Vilnius, Lithuania
 Zevenbergen, Netherlands

Oceania
 Brisbane, (Seven Hills), Australia
 Seven Hills, New South Wales, Australia

See also
 Seven Hills
 Revelation 17 - which mentions a beast on 7 hills

References

Seven hills
Urban planning